

South West (51)

Cornwall (7)

Devon (13)

Somerset (10)

Dorset (4)

Gloucestershire (11)

Wiltshire (6)

South East England (148)

Oxfordshire (4)

Buckinghamshire (3)

Berkshire (5)

Hampshire (11)

Isle of Wight (1)

Surrey (7)

Sussex (9)

Kent (15)

Middlesex (7)

County of London (58) 
This county was formed in 1889: before that these constituencies formed part of Middlesex, Surrey or Kent.

See https://commons.wikimedia.org/wiki/Category:Locator_maps_of_former_parliamentary_constituencies_of_England_1917

East Anglia (55)

Bedfordshire (3)

Hertfordshire (4)

Huntingdonshire (2)

Cambridgeshire and Isle of Ely (4)

Norfolk (10)

Suffolk (8)

Essex (11)

West Midlands (55)

Shropshire (5)

Staffordshire (17)

Herefordshire (3)

Worcestershire (8)

Warwickshire (14)

East Midlands (42)

Derbyshire (9)

Nottinghamshire (7)

Leicestershire (6)

Lincolnshire (11)

Rutland (1)

Northamptonshire (7)

North West England (83)

Cumberland (6)

Westmorland (2)

Lancashire (57)

Cheshire (13)

North East (28)

County Durham (16)

Northumberland (8)

Yorkshire (52)

York (2)

East Riding (6)

North Riding (6)

West Riding (38)

England non-geographic (5)

Wales (34)

Anglesey (1)

Caernarvonshire (3)

Denbighshire (3)

Flintshire (2)

Merionethshire (1)

Montgomeryshire (2)

Radnorshire (1)

Breconshire (1)

Cardiganshire (1)

Carmarthenshire (3)

Pembrokeshire (2)

Glamorganshire (10)

Monmouthshire (4)

Scotland (70)

Orkney and Shetland (1)

Caithness (2) 

1Comprised six parliamentary burghs: Wick in Caithness; Kirkwall in Orkney; Cromarty, Dingwall and Tain in Ross and Cromarty; Dornoch in Sutherland.

Sutherland (1)

Ross and Cromarty (1)

Inverness-shire (2) 

1Comprised four parliamentary burghs: Forres in Elginshire, Inverness in Inverness-shire, Nairn in Nairnshire and Fortrose in Ross and Cromarty.

Banffshire (1)

Elginshire and Nairnshire (2) 

1Comprised five parliamentary burghs: Inverurie, Kintore and Peterhead in Aberdeenshire, Banff and Cullen in Banffshire, and Elgin in Elginshire.

Aberdeenshire (4)

Kincardineshire (1)

Forfarshire (4) 

1Comprised five parliamentary burghs: Arbroath, Brechin, Forfar and Inverbervie in Forfarshire and Montrose in Kincardineshire.

Perthshire (3)

Clackmannanshire and Kinross-shire (1)

Stirlingshire (3) 

1Comprised five parliamentary burghs: Airdrie, Hamilton and Lanark in Lanarkshire, Linlithgow in Linlithgowshire and Falkirk in Stirlingshire.

2Comprised five  parliamentary burghs: Dunfermline and Inverkeithing in Fife; Queensferry in Linlithgowshire; Culross in Perthshire and Stirling in Stirlingshire.

Fife (4) 

1Comprised four parliamentary burghs: Burntisland, Dysart, Kinghorn and Kirkcaldy, all in Fife.

2Comprised seven parliamentary burghs: St Andrews, Anstruther Easter, Anstruther Wester, Crail, Cupar, Kilrenny and Pittenweem,  all in Fife.

Dunbartonshire (1)

Renfrewshire (4)

Ayrshire (4) 

1Comprised five parliamentary burghs: Ayr and Irvine in Ayrshire, Campbeltown and Inverary in Argyllshire and Rothesay in Buteshire.

2Comprised five parliamentary burghs: Kilmarnock in Ayrshire; Dumbarton in Dumbartonshire; Rutherglen in Lanarkshire and Renfrew and Port Glasgow in Renfrewshire.

Argyll (1)

Buteshire (1)

Lanarkshire (12)

Linlithgowshire (1)

Edinburghshire (6) 

1Comprised three parliamentary burghs: Leith, Musselburgh and Portobello, all in the Edinburghshire.

Dumfriesshire (2) 

1Comprised five parliamentary burghs: Annan, Lochmaben and Sanquhar in Dumfriesshire, Dumfries in Dumfriesshire and Kirkcudbrightshire, and Kirkcudbright in Kirkcudbrightshire.

Kirkcudbrightshire (1)

Wigtownshire (1)

Roxburghshire (2) 

1Comprised three parliamentary burghs: Hawick in Roxburghshire and Galashiels and Selkirk in Selkirkshire.

Peeblesshire and Selkirkshire (1)

Berwickshire (1)

Haddingtonshire (1)

Non-geographic (2)

Ulster (33)

Antrim (8)

Londonderry (3)

Tyrone (4)

Armagh (3)

Down (5)

Fermanagh (2)

Donegal (4)

Monaghan (2)

Cavan (2)

Connacht (15)

Galway (5)

Leitrim (2)

Roscommon (2)

Sligo (2)

Mayo (4)

Leinster (30)

Longford (2)

Louth (2)

King's County (2)

Queen's County (2)

Meath (2)

Westmeath (2)

Carlow (1)

Dublin (8)

Wicklow (2)

Kildare (2)

Kilkenny (3)

Wexford (2)

Munster (25)

Clare (2)

Tipperary (4)

Limerick (3)

Kerry (4)

Cork (9)

Waterford (3)

References

See also 

1918
Parliamentary constituencies
Parliamentary constituencies
Parliamentary constituencies
Parliamentary constituencies